James Rufus Tryon (September 24, 1837 – March 20, 1912) was a medical doctor serving in the United States Navy during and after the American Civil War, who went on to become Surgeon General of the United States Navy. His great grandson Lieutenant General Richard T. Tryon was the Commander, United States Marine Corps Forces Command from 2013 until 2015.

Biography
Tryon, born in Coxsackie, New York, attended Union College where he was graduated in 1858 with Phi Beta Kappa honors and membership in The Kappa Alpha Society. He then obtained his M. D. degree from the University of Pennsylvania with additional study at the Ecole de Medecin in Paris, France. He was appointed an Acting Assistant Surgeon (Volunteer) on March 17, 1863. After serving briefly at the United States Naval Hospital in New York City, Tryon spent the last two years of the Civil War at Pensacola, Florida, caring for sick and wounded officers and men of the West Gulf Blockading Squadron.

Next came an assignment in New York City from 1873 to 1876. He served on board  on the European Squadron and off Africa until 1887, when he was assigned to the Medical Examining Board in New York.

The culmination of his career came on 7 September 1893 when Commodore Tryon became Chief of the Bureau of Medicine and Surgery and Surgeon General. He retired on September 24, 1899.

In 1911, Tryon was promoted to the rank of Rear Admiral, retroactive to his date of retirement. Admiral Tryon died on March 20, 1912, at the Naval Hospital in New York City where he had begun his naval career almost half a century before.

See also

References 

1837 births
1912 deaths
People of New York (state) in the American Civil War
Union Navy surgeons
Surgeons General of the United States Navy